Star Jalsha is an Indian Bengali language general entertainment pay television channel owned by The Walt Disney Company India. a wholly owned by The Walt Disney Company. it's primarily telecast family dramas, comedies, reality shows, crime shows and telefilms. It launched its own HD feed on 14 April 2016. According to BARC, Star Jalsha is the most-watched television channel in West Bengal.

History
Star Jalsha was officially launched on 8 September 2008 and is the first non-regional, non-Hindi and non-English channel of Star Network. This was Star India's second Bengali-language television channel of Star India after Star Ananda. In 2011, it was launched on the OSN platform in the Middle East. Its original logo style was also used by Marathi GEC Star Pravah. It was different from the logo style used by most Star channels until the early 2010s, such as Star Plus (until 2010), Star Vijay (until 2017) and Star Jalsha’s Bangla sister channel Star Ananda (until Star TV sold its news networks to the ABP Group on 1 June 2012, two weeks before Star Jalsha’s rebrand).

On 17 June 2012, during a special event Cholo Paltai, it rebranded with a new diamond star logo and graphics for the first time since its launch. On 22 November 2012, the channel was launched in UK.

The channel launched its own high-definition feed, along with Jalsha Movies HD, on 14 April 2016. They were the first Bengali-language HD channels in India.

In 2018, Sagnik Ghosh became the head of the channel. On 17 February 2019, during a special event called Jalsha Doshe Dosh, the channel rebranded for the second time from a white logo with red accents to a red logo with blue accents. It also introduced new coloured graphics after almost 7 years, which are not red and white in the history of the channel, but predominantly turquoise blue with the hints of golden and yellow. The serials also no longer use their own logo. Instead, they use the logo given by Star Jalsha. However, in recent past, the reality shows and events have featured their own logos in the channel with Star Jalsha's Bengali font Kohinoor Bangla.

On 2 October 2021, Star Jalsha, along with other foreign television channels that did not provide clean feeds, was temporarily suspended from broadcasting in Bangladesh. However, on 18 October 2021, Star Jalsha resumed broadcasts in the country with clean feed.

Current broadcast

Fiction series

Non-fiction show

Dubbed series

Upcoming broadcast

Former broadcast

Fiction series
Aaj Aari Kal Bhab (2015-2016)
Aalta Phoring (2022-2023)
Aanchol (2012-2014)
Aay Tobe Sohochori (2021-2022)
Adorini (2017-2018)
Adwitiya (2011-2012)
Aloukik Na Loukik (2019)
Aparajito (2011-2012)
Ardhangini (2018)
Ami Sirajer Begum (2018-2019)
Agnijal (2016-2017)
Behula (2010-2011)
Bhakter Bhogobaan Shri Krishna (2016-2018)
Bajlo Tomar Alor Benu (2018-2019)
Bikram Betal (2022)
Bhojo Gobindo (2017-2018)
Bouma Ekghor (2022)
Bandhan (2008-2009)
Bhaggolokkhi (2020-2021)
@Bhalobasha.com (2010-2014)
Bhasha (2012-2013)
Bhoomikanya (2018-2019)
Bidhir Bidhan (2012-2013)
Bijoyinee (2018-2019)
Bodhuboron (2013-2017)
Bodhu Kon Alo Laaglo Chokhe (2012-2014)
Bojhena Se Bojhena (2013-2016)
Boron (2021-2022)
Bou Kotha Kao (2009-2012)
Care Kori Na (2012-2013)
Charulata (2010)
Checkmate (2012)
Chirosaathi (2012-2014)
Chokher Tara Tui (2014-2016)
Chuni Panna (2019-2020)
Dugga Dugga (2016)
Debipaksha (2017)
Desher Maati (2021)
Dhannyi Meye (2008-2011)
Dhrubatara (2020-2021)
Dhulokona (2021-2022)
Durga (2008-2010)
Durga Durgeshwari (2019-2020)
Durga Durgotinashini (2008-2022)
Debi Choudhurani (2018-2019)
Ekhane Aakash Neel (2008-2010)
Ekhane Aakash Neel 2 (2019-2020)
Falna (2021-2022)
Gaaner Oparey (2010-2011)
Ghore Pherar Gaan (2012-2013)
Gramer Rani Binapani (2021-2022)
Gangaram (2020-2022)
Gopal Bhar (2017-2018)
Guriya Jekhane Guddu Sekhane (2019-2020)
Ichche Dana (2009-2010)
Ichche Nodee (2015-2017)
Irabotir Chupkotha (2018-2020)
Ishti Kutum (2011-2015)
Jai Kali Kalkattawali (2017-2019)
Jani Dekha Hobe (2014-2015)
Jhanjh Lobongo Phool (2016-2017)
Jibon Jyoti (2018)
Jol Nupur (2013-2015)
Kanamachi (2014-2015)
Kapalkundala (2019-2020)
Ke Apon Ke Por (2016-2020)
Khelaghor (2020-2022)
Khorkuto (2020-2022)
Khukumoni Home Delivery (2021-2022)
Kiranmala (2014-2016)
Kora Pakhi (2020-2021)
Kuheli (2008-2009)
Kundo Phooler Mala (2017-2018)
Kunjochaya (2019-2020)
Kusum Dola (2016-2018)
Khokababu (2016-2018)
Koler Bou (2019-2020)
Mahapeeth Tarapeeth (2019-2022)
Maa....Tomay Chara Ghum Ashena (2009-2014)
Madhabilata (2022)
Mayar Badhon (2017-2018)
Mahanayak (2016)
Mayurpankhi (2018-2019)
Megher Palak (2011-2012)
Membou (2016-2017)
Milon Tithi (2015-2017)
Mohor (2019-2022)
Mon Niye Kachakachi (2015)
Mon Phagun (2021-2022)
Mouchaak (2013-2014)
Mukhosh Manush (2010-2011)
Nabab Nandini (2022-2023)
Neer Bhanga Jhor
Nojor (2019)
Ogo Bodhu Sundori (2009-2010)
Ogo Nirupoma (2020-2021)
Om Namah Shivay (2018)
Phagun Bou (2018-2019)
Potol Kumar Gaanwala (2015-2017)
Pratidaan (2017-2018)
Premer Kahini (2017)
Punyi Pukur (2015-2017)
Prothoma Kadambini (2020-2021)
Rakhi Bandhan (2016-2019)
Roilo Pherar Nimontron (2011)
Saanjher Baati (2019-2021)
Shedin Dujone(2011)
Shob Choritro Kalponik (2015)
Sindoorkhela (2010-2012)
Sokhi (2013-2014)
Shree Krishna Bhakto Meera (2021)
Sanyashi Raja (2017-2018)
Sansar Sukher Hoy Romonir Guney (2011-2013)
Shaheber Chithi (2022-2023)
Sreemoyee (2019-2021)
Swapno Udaan (2017)
Taare Aami Chokhe Dekhini
Tapur Tupur (2011-2013)
Thakumar Jhuli (2019)
Thik Jeno Love Story (2014-2015)
Titli (2020-2021)
Tomake Chai (2011-2012)
Tomar Jonno
Tomay Amay Mile (2013-2016)
Tumi Asbe Bole (2014-2016)
Tekka Raja Badshah (2018-2019)

Acquired series
Devadidev Mahadev
Mahabharat
Sita
Ramayan
Joy Gopal
Mahaprabhu
Oye Golu
Sri Ramkrishna
Super V
Supercops v/s Supervillains

Reality shows 
1000 Ghonta (2011)
Aamar Bor Superstar
Aamra Na Ora Season 1 & 2
Apni Ki Bolen
Bhyabachaka Season 1 & 2
Dance Dance Junior (2019-2020)
Dance Dance Junior Season 2 (2021)
Dance Dance Junior Season 3 (2022)
Eber Jombe Moja (2019)
Ebaar Jalsha Rannaghore Season 1, 2 & 3
Enjoy Guru
Ghosh & Company
Golemale Gol
Hashiwala & Company (2020-2021)
I Laugh You Season 1, 2 & 3
Ismart Jodi (2022)
Joto Hasi Toto Ranna
Konye Tui Megastar
Koti Takar Baaji
Phire Asar Gaan
Priyo Bandhabi
Royal Bengal Superstar
Saat Pakke Bandha
Start Music (2019-2020)
Ranna Banna (2020-2021)
Super Singer Junior (2019)
Super Singer (2020)
Super Singer Season 3 (2021-22)
Swapno Holeo Shottyi
Swayamvar
You Laugh Me

Sister channels

Jalsha Movies

Star Jalsha Movies (commonly known as Jalsha Movies) is an Indian Bengali-Language movie channel owned by Disney Star. It was launched on 16 December 2012 as a sister channel of Star Jalsha.

Jalsha Josh

Star Jalsha Josh (or Jalsha Josh) is an upcoming Bengali language youth entertainment television channel from the broadcaster. It was originally planned to be launched on 1 December 2021, but was postponed due to issues involving the implementation of the Telecom Regulatory Authority of India's New Tariff Order 2.0

Reception
Within its launch after seven months, Star Jalsha became the most watched Indian Bengali-language channel in April 2009.

Ratings

References

External links

 

Bengali-language television channels in India
Television stations in Kolkata
Television channels and stations established in 2008
Disney Star
2008 establishments in West Bengal